"Eastside" is a song by American record producer Benny Blanco and American singers Halsey and Khalid Robinson. The song was released on July 12, 2018, as Blanco's debut single. 

The single debuted on the Billboard Hot 100 in the issue dated July 28, 2018, at number 56, and peaked at number nine on the chart, marking Blanco's first top 10 single credited as an artist and his 27th top 10 as a songwriter. Outside of the United States, "Eastside" topped the charts in New Zealand, the Republic of Ireland, Singapore, and the United Kingdom, and peaked within the top ten of the charts in several other countries, including Australia, Canada, Denmark, and Norway.

Additionally, "Eastside" spent 45 weeks on Billboard's Pop Songs radio airplay chart, tying the longevity record for the most weeks spent on the chart with Khalid and Normani's "Love Lies" and Dua Lipa's "New Rules"; this record has since been broken and is currently held by The Weeknd's "Blinding Lights".

Composition
"Eastside" is originally in the key of A major, with a tempo of 89 beats per minute and a chord progression of Fm–E–A–D–E. The song is musically based around a "hazily" plucked guitar riff. Lyrically, "Eastside" discusses the development and complexities of a forbidden romantic relationship; it also discusses maturing, similar to a coming of age story.

Release
Blanco premiered the song on July 12 on the Beats 1 station on Apple Music, in an interview with Zane Lowe. The song was then released for streaming and as a download, and the music video was released on the same day.

Live performances
Blanco, Halsey, and Khalid performed the song at the American Music Awards of 2018, with a "bedroom setting". Halsey also performed "Eastside" solo on her 2018 tour. In February 2019, Halsey performed the entire song live on Saturday Night Live. During her performance of the song, she painted an upside-down portrait of a woman's head on the floor of the stage.

Copyright infringement lawsuit
In May 2021 a lawsuit for copyright infringement was filed against Blanco and the other co-writers of "Eastside"  by the band American XO alleging that the guitar riff that forms the basis of "Eastside" was copied from their 2015 song "Loveless.” The Lawsuit contains an audio comparison, referred to as “Exhibit A” of the two songs being played simultaneously that allegedly shows the similarities between the main riff of "Eastside" and the guitar hook for "Loveless."

Charts

Weekly charts

Year-end charts

Decade-end charts

Certifications

Release history

See also
 List of best-selling singles in Australia
 List of number-one songs of 2018 (Singapore)

References 

2018 songs
2018 debut singles
Benny Blanco songs
Khalid (singer) songs
Halsey (singer) songs
Interscope Records singles
Irish Singles Chart number-one singles
Number-one singles in New Zealand
Number-one singles in Singapore
Songs written by Benny Blanco
Songs written by Ed Sheeran
Songs written by Halsey (singer)
Songs written by Khalid (singer)
Song recordings produced by Benny Blanco
Song recordings produced by Cashmere Cat
UK Singles Chart number-one singles
Songs written by Happy Perez